Sweet Lucy Records is an independent record label that was formed in 1996 out of Cincinnati, Ohio.

See also
 List of record labels

Record labels established in 1996
American independent record labels